Souled American is an American alternative country band from Chicago that was active mostly in the late-1980s and early-1990s. The band was founded in Normal, Illinois and consists of vocalists Chris Grigoroff (also guitar) and Joe Adducci (also bass) who both previously played in a ska/reggae band called The Uptown Rulers.

History 
Souled American recorded four albums for Rough Trade Records. In 1991, drummer Jamey Barnard left the band, and in 1992 the band released its fourth album (and last for Rough Trade), Sonny,  eight of the ten songs on which are cover tunes. After four albums and a tour with Camper Van Beethoven, the group was met with critical acclaim and a loyal cult following. Despite this, Rough Trade folded and Souled American was left without a label.

The band re-emerged in 1994 with Frozen and 1996's Notes Campfire, both released on the obscure German label Moll Tonträger. Sometime after 1996, guitarist Scott Tuma also left the band leaving the duo of Adducci and Grigoroff still intact. The remaining two members have since made sporadic appearances in their hometown and additional shows in New York City, Chicago, and Ohio. A re-release of their first four albums on Tumult Records in 1999 brought some belated attention. In 1997, New York artist Camden Joy created a poster project called "Fifty Posters About Souled American" (the ultimate number exceeded the originally planned 50), consisting of typewritten comments and stories by various artists and musicians on the mostly forgotten band. Joy then distributed the posters around Greenwich Village.

Since his departure, Scott Tuma released three solo albums: Hard Again (Atavistic), The River 1 2 3 4 (Truckstop Records), and Not For Nobody (Digitalis). He also recorded a CD under the name Good Stuff House in 2006 with members of the Chicago band Zelienople and occasionally performs and records with Chicago's Boxhead Ensemble.

The only studio material available since 1996 is a cover of Kris Kristofferson's "Please Don't Tell Me How the Story Ends" on a 2002 tribute album and "Ringside Suite", a brand new song (as well as an interview) found on a compilation CD in issue No. 4 of Yeti magazine. It is the band's only available original recording in almost a decade and the only recording to feature the current duo line-up of Adducci and Grigoroff.

In the May 2006, the band resurfaced for a show at The DuKum Upp in Kirksville, Missouri. In the summer of 2007, they played two shows in Colorado and Wyoming and announced that they are working on material for a new album in their home near Charleston, Illinois.

Personnel
Joe Adducci, bass, vocals
Chris Grigoroff, guitar, vocals
Scott Tuma, guitar (left the band sometime after 1996)
Jamey Barnard, drums (left the band in 1991)

Discography
 On Rough Trade Records
 1988: Fe
 1989: Flubber
 1990: Around the Horn
 1992: Sonny
On Moll Tonträger
 1994: Frozen
 1996: Notes Campfire
On tUMULt Records
 1999: Framed – 4-CD re-issue of the first four albums
Compilation appearances
 2002: "Please Don't Tell Me How the Story Ends" on "Nothing Left to Lose: A Tribute to Kris Kristofferson"
 2006: "Ringside Suite" on the Yeti Magazine No. 4 compilation

References

External links
Official website
Centerstage Chicago entry
Tumult listing
"Fifty Posters About Souled American"

American alternative country groups
Musical groups from Chicago
Rough Trade Records artists
Musical groups established in 1987
Tumult Records artists